Kadogawa Bosai Dam  is a rockfill dam located in Miyazaki Prefecture in Japan. The dam is used for flood control. The catchment area of the dam is 6 km2. The dam impounds about 12  ha of land when full and can store 737 thousand cubic meters of water. The construction of the dam was completed in 1972.

See also
List of dams in Japan

References

Dams in Miyazaki Prefecture